The Misgav Regional Council (Mo'atza Azorit Misgav ISO 259-3 Moˁaça ʔazorit Miśgabb) is a regional council in the Galilee region in northern Israel. The regional council is home to 27,421 people, and comprises 35 small towns, mostly community settlements but also several Kibbutzim and Moshavim. The population of 29 of these is primarily Jewish, and 6 are Bedouin. The region is noted for the way that communities and non-Jewish communities live side-by-side.

The administrative designation regional council does not imply that every town in some contiguous geographic region belongs to it. Most Arab-Israeli towns in the region are not part of the regional council, and are considered separate local councils. Neither is Karmiel, a city which lies in the heart of the Misgav region but does not belong to the regional council. The population of Karmiel alone is more than twice that of the entire Misgav Regional Council.

History

In the early 1970s, the Galilee region in general, including what is now the area of Misgav, was predominantly populated by Arab communities including those of Druze and Bedouin origin who were living on and farming much of the arable land. Those involved in the development of the region designated that land which was not in use as nature reserves in light of the rapid urbanization which Israel was seeing at the time. That area which was not designated as a nature reserve was planned to be a series of settlements on the Galilean hilltops - the idea of the mitzpeh was conceived.

Mitzpeh literally means an observation point but the term has a much broader connotation. In Misgav, most of the villages are defined as community settlements whose inhabitants conduct their daily life completely independently from one another. Because, however, of the size of the communities, and because each community is fairly isolated a limited interdependence is required to maintain the normal frameworks and mutual interests of the residents. As a result, community run childcare centers, youth activities, and the maintenance of communal buildings and property tend to be run on a volunteer basis, unique to this region, and Israel in general, through an elected resident's committee in addition to

From its inception, the Misgav area attracted modern day pioneers who were willing to give up basic comforts to live in temporary and cramped quarters in order to realize a pioneering dream of a better life for themselves and their children. People from the entire spectrum of political and Jewish background arrived united by an overall goal of creating a new center of Jewish communal revival in the heart of the Galilee.

Today, Misgav can be seen in many ways as resembling a typical Israeli suburb surrounding a large city, except for the fact that it is spread out over an area of 50,000 acres (200 km²) with a population of just 15,000 including 4,500 Bedouin Arabs. Like the suburbs, the area houses most families in detached, one-family homes surrounded by yards, and the majority of adults drive to work in the urban centers every day while the children are bused to the local schools.

There are however, certain factors that make Misgav entirely unique. Firstly, the sheer diversity of the communities is exemplary. Among the Misgav settlements there are five kibbutzim, including a Reform Judaism community, a Conservative Judaism community, a mixed Orthodox-Secular community, and a strictly observant Jewish village, all of which exist peacefully and respectfully alongside each other. Misgav is also unique in its relations with its non-Jewish residents and neighbors. Five local Bedouin settlements have been absorbed by the regional council and are active members of the Misgav community, which also cooperates with the large Muslim Arab, Christian Arab, and Druze populations in the region. This cooperation can be shown by the fact that the region is the location of one of the country's first dual language (Arab-Hebrew) educational institutions, the Galil Jewish-Arab School.

Misgav Settlements

Jewish

Kibbutzim

Eshbal
Kishorit

Lotem
Moran

Pelekh
Tuval

Yahad

Moshavim
Ya'ad

Moshav Shitufi
Yodfat

Community settlements

Atzmon
Avtalion
Eshhar
Gilon
Har Halutz
Hararit

Harashim
Kamon
Koranit
Lavon
Ma'ale Tzviya

Manof
Mikhmanim
Mitzpe Aviv
Moreshet
Rakefet

Shekhanya
Shorashim
Tal El
Tzurit
Yuvalim

Arab Bedouin villages

Arab al-kobsi
Arab al-Na'im
Dmeide

Hussniyya
Kamanneh

Ras al-Ein

Sallama

Go North Program
In the late 2000s, the Jewish charity Nefesh B'Nefesh launched its Go North program. Keeping with the organization's purpose of facilitating Jewish immigration to Israel, the program is designed to entice new immigrants and residents who have been in the country for a short time to move to several developing Jewish communities in the country's northern region.  The Misgav Regional Council is a partner in the program, whereas its towns Lavon, Har Halutz, Moreshet, Eshchar, Shorashim, Manof, and Tal El are listed by the organization as preferred destinations for participants.

Controversy
In December 2009, Haaretz reported "Jewish town won’t let Arab build home on his own land". Aadel Suad first went to the planning committee of the Misgav Local Council in 1997. Suad, an educator, sought a permit to build a home on a plot of land he owns in the community of Mitzpeh Kamon. Suad has now been fighting the committee’s red tape for 12 years to build a home on his own land. He and his family are convinced there is only one reason for the refusal, the local council doesn’t want Arabs. 

Misgav's planning policy has been in the news before. In 2005 Ali Zbeidat, an Israeli Arab, and his Dutch wife Terese and their two teenage daughters, Dina and Awda, were threatened with demolition of their home, built on land belonging to his family for decades and physically located inside the Arab town of Sakhnin.

References

External links
Council website 

 
Regional councils in Northern District (Israel)